Zunzunegui is a surname. Notable people with the surname include:

Fernando Zunzunegui (1943–2014), Spanish footballer
Haritz Zunzunegui (born 1975), Spanish cross-country skier
Juan Zunzunegui (born 1976), Spanish rower
Juan Carlos Guerra Zunzunegui (died 2020), Spanish lawyer and politician